Brachionus is a genus of planktonic rotifers occurring in freshwater, alkaline and brackish water.

Species
Species included in Brachionus include:

 Brachionus amsterdamensis De Smet, 2001
 Brachionus angularis Gosse, 1851
 Brachionus asplanchnoides Charin, 1947
 Brachionus calyciflorus Pallas, 1766
 Brachionus diversicornis (Daday, 1883)
 Brachionus havanaensis Rousselet, 1911
 Brachionus ibericus Ciros-Peréz, Gómez & Serra, 2001
 Brachionus leydigii Cohn, 1862
 Brachionus manjavacas Fontaneto, Giordani, Melone & Serra, 2007
 Brachionus nilsoni Ahlstrom
 Brachionus plicatilis Müller, 1786
 Brachionus quadridentatus Hermann, 1783
 Brachionus rotundiformis Tschugunoff, 1921
 Brachionus rubens Ehrenberg, 1838
 Brachionus urceolaris Müller, 1773
 Brachionus variabilis Hempel, 1896

Use
Rotifers such as Brachionus calyciflorus are favored test animals in aquatic toxicology because of their sensitivity to most toxicants. They also are used as model organisms in various other biological fields e.g. due to their interesting reproductive mode in evolutionary ecology. 
Brachionus spp. are easily reared in large numbers and because of this are used to substitute for wild zooplankton for feeding hatchery reared larval fish. However, the composition of rotifers generally does not satisfy the nutritional requirements of fish larvae, and large amounts of research have been invested in improving the lipid, vitamin and mineral composition of rotifers to better meet the requirements of fish larvae

Reproduction
Brachionus species can normally reproduce sexually and asexually (cyclical parthenogenesis). Sexual reproduction (termed Mixis) is usually induced when population density increases. Mixis in Brachionus plicatilis  has been shown to be induced by a density-dependent chemical cue.

Transitions to obligate parthenogenesis have been described in Brachionus calyciflorus. In this species, obligate parthenogenesis can be inherited by a recessive allele, which leads to loss of sexual reproduction in homozygous offspring. In Brachionus manjavacas rotifers, offspring's survival and its cell's ability to growth and division decrease with advancing age of mother.

Genome size
Haploid '1C' genome sizes in Brachionus species range at least from 0.056 to 0.416 pg.

Genome sequencing
The complete mitochondrial genome of B. plicatilis sensu stricto NH1L has been sequenced.

Cryptic species
Brachionus plicatilis has been demonstrated to be a large cryptic species complex consisting of several different species. It has a worldwide diversity of at least 14 - 22 cryptic taxa.

Brachionus calyciflorus also seems to be a cryptic species complex.

References

Huang, L. "Effectof Aldrin on Life History Characteristics of Rotifer Brachionus calyciflorus Pallas." Bull Environ Contam Toxicol no5 N 2007

Rotifer genera
Brachionidae